The 1998–99 Macedonian First League was the 7th season of the Macedonian First Football League, the highest football league of Macedonia. The first matches of the season were played on 9 August 1998 and the last on 29 May 1999. Sileks were the defending champions, having won their third title in a row. The 1998-99 champions were Sloga Jugomagnat who had won their first title.

Promotion and relegation 

1 Bregalnica Shtip was removed from the league after the round 19, due to their absence in a scheduled match against Sloga Jugomagnat. Their matches from round 14 were annulled.

Participating teams

League table

Results

Top goalscorers

Source: Top15goalscorers.blogspot.com

See also 
 1998–99 Macedonian Football Cup
 1998–99 Macedonian Second Football League

External links 
 Macedonia - List of final tables (RSSSF)
 Football Federation of Macedonia

Macedonia
1
Macedonian First Football League seasons